The EMD GA18 was an export locomotive built by GM-EMD in 1969. The GA18 was a derivative of the EMD G18 and was designed as an extremely light locomotive with low axle loading which used freight car trucks driven by cardan shafts and two traction motors attached to the underframe. It is the successor model of the EMD GA8. They are powered by an EMD 8-645E prime mover rated at 1100 bhp and 1000 hp for traction.  Only seven units were built.

Original Owners

Chile

1 FCAB  953

Taiwan

5  Taiwan Railway Administration S401-S405

Zambia

1  Nchanga Consol Copper   10

Taiwan Railway Administration
Taiwan Railway Administration purchased five GA18 locomotives in 1969 which were equipped with special cab signal display and track sorting devices for use as Qidu hump yard switching locomotives. They were named the S400 series by the TRA. In addition to yard switching, the TRA S400 series GA18's were also used to pull short run commuter trains. 
After the closing of Qidu hump yard, the S400 series were used as general road switchers until their retirement.
All have been scrapped with the exception of S405 which has been preserved and restored in its original Navy blue paint scheme and is currently on display in Miaoli Railway Museum, and S402 which is currently stored in a half-dismantled state in Taipei Railway Workshop to await preservation following the workshop's transition to a railway museum.

Gallery

References

G18A
Diesel-electric locomotives of Chile
Diesel-electric locomotives of Taiwan
Diesel-electric locomotives of Zambia
Metre gauge diesel locomotives
3 ft 6 in gauge locomotives